Kuber Peak is a 770 m peak in Delchev Ridge, Tangra Mountains on Livingston Island in the South Shetland Islands, Antarctica.  Overlooking Magura Glacier to the southwest, Dobrudzha Glacier to the southeast, and Iskar Glacier to the north.

Named after Khan Kuber whose Bulgars left Pannonia to settle in Western Macedonia and Albania around 680 AD, and established a state that in the early 8th century AD merged with the First Bulgarian Empire.

Location
(Bulgarian mapping in 2005 and 2009).

Maps 
 L.L. Ivanov et al., Antarctica: Livingston Island and Greenwich Island, South Shetland Islands (from English Strait to Morton Strait, with illustrations and ice-cover distribution), 1:100000 scale topographic map, Antarctic Place-names Commission of Bulgaria, Sofia, 2005.
 L.L. Ivanov. Antarctica: Livingston Island and Greenwich, Robert, Snow and Smith Islands. Scale 1:120000 topographic map.  Troyan: Manfred Wörner Foundation, 2009.

External links
Kuber Peak. SCAR Composite Antarctic Gazetteer
 Bulgarian Antarctic Gazetteer. Antarctic Place-names Commission. (details in Bulgarian, basic data in English)
 Kuber Peak. Copernix satellite image

Tangra Mountains